Marla Lukofsky is a Canadian-American stand-up comedian, actress, singer, writer, and keynote speaker. She's one of the pioneers of stand-up comedy in Canada and has performed in every major city in North America, the UK and the first female comedian to headline in Bermuda. 

Lukofsky has appeared in a variety of TV shows including An Evening at the Improv with Elliott Gould, The Palace TV Variety Series with Jack Jones and The Alan Thicke Show as well as starring in feature films such as Honeymoon with Nathalie Baye and John Shea and Zero Patience. 

Lukofsky was a regular radio columnist on The Vicki Gabereau Show and CBC's 'Basic Black' with host Arthur Black and became the regular last word columnist on CBC's national TV news show Midday with Keith Morrison and Valerie Pringle completing 100 segments. She has voiced many cartoon series including The Care Bears TV series and movies, Alf Tales, Super Mario Bros., Pecola and Fugget About It.

Early life 
Lukofsky was born in Toronto, Ontario in 1956 to Ruth and Louis Lukofsky and has two older sisters.

Career 
Lukofsky started her career in 1973 as a funny folk singer at the famed Riverboat in Toronto and performed at every folk club in Toronto. In 1975, she became a regular at a new comedy club called 'The Improv' with Gene Taylor, along with other regulars including Rick Moranis and Martin Short. 

By 1978, Lukofsky became a regular headliner at Mark Breslin's Yuk Yuks Comedy chain and toured Canada sharing the bill with Jim Carrey and Howie Mandel. She was briefly a member of Toronto's The Second City Touring Company but preferred the nightclub circuit and returned to the road. 

For three consecutive years, the PROCAN Music Awards had Lukofsky and John Roberts, host their awards event in 1985-1987. In 1990, Lukofsky moved to Los Angeles and played a variety of nightclubs, sharing the bill with comedian Sherri Shepherd at West Hollywood's 'The Rose Tattoo' Cabaret and other establishments. 

In 2015 Lukofsky began singing jazz in Toronto, combining her comedy skills with her vocal talents and in 2016 was featured in the TD Toronto Jazz Festival.

Television

Movies

References

Stand-up becomes inspirational: Marla Lukofsky by Diane Flacks, Toronto Star .
Marla [sic] Lukofsky: Mini Mistress of Mirth by Andrew Clark,Eye Weekly .
Breast cancer survivor tells her story through laughter by Lisa Queen, www.insidetoronto.com North York Mirror 10.03.08 .
Comic reinvents herself as jazz singer by Ruth Schweitzer, The Canadian Jewish News 
Battling cancer with humour by Ted Woloshyn, Toronto Sun ''.

External links

Marla Lukofsky at VoiceChasers.com
Marla Lukofsky website

1956 births
Living people
Canadian women comedians
Canadian film actresses
Canadian television actresses
Canadian voice actresses
Seneca College alumni